New Skin may refer to:

New Skin (CRX album), 2016
New Skin (Jones album) or the title song, 2016
New Skin, an album by Vérité, 2019
"New Skin" (song), by Incubus, 1998
"New Skin", a song by Methods of Mayhem from Methods of Mayhem, 1999
"New Skin", a song by Siouxsie & the Banshees from the Showgirls film soundtrack, 1995

See also
Liquid bandage
Scar